Sheikh Maqsood, sometimes spelled al-Sheikh Maqsoud, Maqsud or Maksud, is a Kurdish-majority neighborhood in the city of Aleppo, Syria. It is controlled by the People's Protection Units (YPG).

Syrian Civil War

During the Syrian Civil War, the Kurdish-majority People's Protection Units (YPG) took control of the neighborhood. Separated from the larger Kurdish regions of Syria, Sheikh Maqsood had been vulnerable to assaults by the Al-Nusra Front and other Islamist rebel groups which were besieging the district from all directions but the south and west until they were driven back by pro-government forces in 2016.

Islamist rebel groups frequently shelled Sheikh Maqsood. In May 2016, Amnesty International's regional director suggested that the attacks on Sheikh Maqsood constituted war crimes. Between February and April 2016, more than 83 civilians were killed by the attacks. In mid-June 2016, Russia accused the rebel militias of causing the death of over 40 civilians that month. A Syrian Democratic Forces (SDF) spokesman accused rebels of causing 1,000 civilian deaths and injuries, through their shelling of Sheikh Maqsood.

A United Nations report from February 2017 came to the conclusion that, while during the siege of Eastern Aleppo the attacks against Sheikh Maqsoud decreased, Islamist rebel groups affiliated with Fatah Halab, after vowing to take revenge on the Kurds in Sheikh Maqsoud, intentionally attacked civilian neighborhoods of the Kurdish enclave – killing and  maiming dozens of civilians – and that these acts constituted the war crime of directing attacks against a civilian population. In February 2023, the neighborhood was affected by an earthquake.

References

Neighborhoods of Aleppo
Kurdish communities in Syria